William Chandler may refer to:
Bill Chandler, college basketball coach
Bill Chandler (ice hockey) (1930–1991), Canadian ice hockey player
William Chandler (bookmaker) (died 1946), British bookmaker
William Chandler (businessman), 19th-century abolitionist and railroad executive
William Chandler (character) character in the soap opera Fashion House
William Chandler (racing driver) (1890–1924), American racecar driver
William B. Chandler, III, American judge
William E. Chandler (1835–1917), United States Secretary of the Navy and senator
William Henry Chandler (disambiguation)
William W. Chandler, engineer, see Post Office Research Station